Mark Jerome Steedman,  (born 18 September 1946) is a computational linguist and cognitive scientist.

Biography
Steedman graduated from the University of Sussex in 1968, with a B.Sc. in Experimental Psychology, and from the University of Edinburgh in 1973, with a Ph.D. in Artificial Intelligence (Dissertation: The Formal Description of Musical Perception  gained in 1972. Advisor: Prof. H.C. Longuet-Higgins FRS).

He has held posts as Lecturer in Psychology, University of Warwick (1977–83); Lecturer and Reader in Computational Linguistics, University of Edinburgh (1983–8); Associate and full Professor in Computer and Information Sciences, University of Pennsylvania (1988–98). He has held visiting positions at the University of Texas at Austin, the Max Planck Institute for Psycholinguistics, Nijmegen, and the University of Pennsylvania, Philadelphia.

Steedman currently holds the Chair of Cognitive Science in the School of Informatics at the University of Edinburgh (1998– ). He works in computational linguistics, artificial intelligence, and cognitive science, on Generation of Meaningful Intonation for Speech by Artificial Agents, Animated Conversation, The Communicative Use of Gesture, Tense and Aspect, and Combinatory Categorial Grammar (CCG). He is also interested in Computational Musical Analysis and combinatory logic.

Distinctions 
 Member of the Academia Europæa (2006)
 Fellow of the British Academy (2002).
 Fellow of the Royal Society of Edinburgh (2002)
 AAAI Fellow (1993)
 President elect for 2008 of the Association for Computational Linguistics
 Fellow of the Association for Computational Linguistics (2012)

Principal publications

References

External links
 Mark Steedman's Home Page
 Elected AAAI Fellows
 Fellowship of the Royal Society of Edinburgh
 ACL Fellows

1946 births
Living people
Fellows of the British Academy
Artificial intelligence researchers
Alumni of the University of Sussex
Alumni of the University of Edinburgh
Academics of the University of Edinburgh
Fellows of the Royal Society of Edinburgh
Fellows of the Association for the Advancement of Artificial Intelligence
Fellows of the SSAISB
Members of Academia Europaea
British computer scientists
Linguists from the United Kingdom
Fellows of the Cognitive Science Society
Fellows of the Association for Computational Linguistics
Natural language processing researchers
Computational linguistics researchers
Presidents of the Association for Computational Linguistics